Diego Barrios may refer to:
Diego Barrios (footballer, born March 1987), Paraguayan footballer
Diego Barrios (footballer, born July 1987), Paraguayan footballer
Diego Barrios (Spanish footballer) (born 1994), Spanish footballer